Li Meifang (born 20 August 1978) is a former road cyclist from China. She represented her nation at the 2003, 2006 and 2007 UCI Road World Championships. She also competed in the women's points race at the 2004 Summer Olympics.

References

External links
 profile at Procyclingstats.com

1978 births
Chinese female cyclists
Living people
Place of birth missing (living people)
Asian Games medalists in cycling
Cyclists at the 2002 Asian Games
Cyclists at the 2006 Asian Games
Medalists at the 2002 Asian Games
Medalists at the 2006 Asian Games
Asian Games gold medalists for China
Asian Games silver medalists for China
Olympic cyclists of China
Cyclists at the 2004 Summer Olympics
21st-century Chinese women